Richard C. Meyer (5 April 1920–19 July 1985) was a German-American television and film editor and occasional film writer and film producer. He was nominated for a Primetime Emmy Award for Outstanding Film Editing for the miniseries King (1978). He also won the BAFTA Award for Best Editing for Butch Cassidy and the Sundance Kid in 1970, which he shared with John C. Howard.

He worked as a film editor for such films as Waterloo, Capone and Three in the Attic.

References

External links

20th-century births
1985 deaths
20th-century American screenwriters
American film editors
American people of German descent
Best Editing BAFTA Award winners